Mwanedi Game Reserve, is a neighbour of the Kruger Park, located in the northern (or Venda) part of the Limpopo, province, South Africa, and has an area of about 9300 Ha. One of the secrets of the Game Reserve is their spectacular waterfall, known as Tshihovhohovho Falls.

See also 
 Protected areas of South Africa

References

it some times also hosts large scale paint-ball fights in which it is recommended that participants ride the animals to act as cavalry and transport

Nature reserves in South Africa